is a traditional video game released in 2002 by Konami. The game was only released in Japan. The game is based on the traditional board game shogi.

External links
Page at Nintendo.co.jp

2002 video games
GameCube games
PlayStation 2 games
Cancelled Xbox games
Konami games
Japan-exclusive video games
Video games developed in Japan